Govhar Agha Mosque can refer to:
Yukhari Govhar Agha Mosque, mosque in upper district of Shusha, Azerbaijan
Ashaghi Govhar Agha Mosque, mosque in lower district of Shusha, Azerbaijan

See also
Religion in Azerbaijan